Ormetica packardi is a moth of the family Erebidae. It was described by Arthur Gardiner Butler in 1876. It is found in French Guiana, Suriname, Brazil, Ecuador and Peru.

References

Ormetica
Moths described in 1876
Arctiinae of South America